Ahmed Al-Habib  (born 2 January 1993) is a Saudi professional footballer who currently plays as a defender for Abha.

References

 

1993 births
Living people
Saudi Arabian footballers
People from Al-Hasa
Al-Adalah FC players
Najran SC players
Al-Raed FC players
Ettifaq FC players
Abha Club players
Saudi Professional League players
Association football defenders
Saudi Arabian Shia Muslims